Alastor antigae is a species of wasp in the family Vespidae.

References

antigae
Insects described in 1903